Terrence Malick is an American film director, screenwriter and producer. Throughout his career, which has spanned over four decades, he has directed nine feature films and one documentary. He has also written scripts for other directors, and in recent times has acted as producer and executive producer on numerous projects.

Major associations

Academy Awards

Golden Globe Awards

Film festival awards

Berlin International Film Festival

Cannes Film Festival

Venice Film Festival

Other awards

Awards received by Malick movies

References

Malick, Terence